Simone Genevois (13 February 1912 – 16 December 1995) was a French film actress. She began her career as a child actor. Her best-known role was in the 1929 epic Saint Joan the Maid in which she played the title part of Joan of Arc.

Selected filmography
 Simone (1918)
 The House of Mystery (1923)
 André Cornélis (1927)
 Saint Joan the Maid (1929)
 The Dream (1931)

References

Bibliography 
 Marina Warner. Joan of Arc: The Image of Female Heroism. OUP, 2013.

External links 
 

1912 births
1995 deaths
French film actresses
French silent film actresses
20th-century French actresses
French child actresses
Actresses from Paris